Germaine Habiba Ahidjo (11 February 1932 – 20 April 2021) was a Cameroonian politician and nurse. She was the wife of the first president of Cameroon, Ahmadou Ahidjo. She was thus the First Lady of Cameroon from 1960 until 1982. She died on  the morning of 20 April 2021, at the age of 89 at Dakar in Senegal where she had been suffering from protracted illness.

Biography 
Germaine Habiba Ahidjo was born in Mokolo in 1932 to Hawa and Yaya Boubawa.

In 1942, she obtained her certificate of studies in Yaoundé. She later joined the Girls College of Douala, today New-Bell High School.

In 1947, she was awarded a scholarship to France, where she graduated as a state nurse in 1952 and specialized in tropical diseases.

She became friend with Ahmadou Ahidjo in 1955 and they were married on 17 August, 1956. They had three daughters: Babette, Aissatou and Aminatou. She also had a son, Daniel Toufick, born before her marriage with Ahidjo. Mohamadou Badjika Ahidjo, now a deputy and a visiting ambassador, is the son of Ahidjo with his first wife, Ada Garoua. After the resignation of her husband in 1982 and her death sentence in absentia as a result of her supposed involvement in the failed coup of 1984, they settled in Dakar, Senegal, where she still lived. Her husband died on 30 November 1989. She campaigned for his official rehabilitation, including the repatriation of his ashes to Cameroon. She died on 19 April 2021, at age 89 in Dakar, Sénégal.

References 

1932 births
2021 deaths
First ladies of Cameroon
Cameroonian exiles
Cameroonian expatriates in France
Cameroonian expatriates in Senegal
People from Far North Region (Cameroon)